Cestodaria is one of two subclasses of the class Cestoda.  The Cestodaria subclass is made up of Amphilinidea and Gyrocotylidea. The larvae have ten hooks on the posterior end.

References 

Cestoda
Protostome subclasses